Sarre Windmill is a Grade II listed smock mill in Sarre, Kent, England, that was built in 1820. Formerly restored and working commercially, the mill is now closed.

History
Sarre windmill was built in 1820 by the Canterbury millwright John Holman. It was said to have been moved from Monkton, but it is more likely to have had some machinery from that mill included in its construction. It was marked on  the 1819-43 Ordnance Survey map. Sarre mill was the first windmill in Kent to have a steam engine installed as auxiliary power. This was added in 1861. The mill was worked by wind until 1920, when the sails were taken down, and installed on the Union Mill, Cranbrook and a gas engine was fitted. The mill worked for a few years longer powered by the gas engine, but had ceased milling by the early 1930s. The mill was recommissioned in the late 1930s, again powered by the gas engine, before finally stopping in 1940 as the engine had been damaged by frost in the severe winter that year. The mill was used as an observation post during the Second World War. The mill remained semi-derelict until 1986, when restoration was started, being completed in 1991.

Description

Sarre windmill is a three-storey smock mill on a two-storey brick base. It has four double patent sails carried on a cast-iron windshaft. The mill is winded by a fantail. The Brake Wheel is a composite one, with iron arms and a wooden rim. This drives a cast-iron Wallower. The Great Spur Wheel is also of cast iron. The mill drives two pairs of millstones, overdrift.

Millers

Thomas Holman 1845 - 1862
George Thomas Steddy 1878
Ebenezer Wood 1880 - 1883
Hogben
Gambrill - 1940
Malcolm Hobbs 1991 -
Robert Hobbs 1991 -

References for above:-

In Popular Culture

For Bread Week of Season 1 of The Great British Bake Off, the tent was pitched near the windmill.

References

External links
Windmill World page on the mill.
Local tourism information on Sarre Windmill
Hoseasons Sarre Windmill holiday cottage

Windmills in Kent
Grinding mills in the United Kingdom
Smock mills in England
Grade II listed buildings in Kent
Windmills completed in 1820
Museums in Thanet District
Mill museums in England
Octagonal buildings in the United Kingdom